Fish Lake is a census-designated place and unincorporated community in Christiania Township, Jackson County, Minnesota, United States. Its population was 51 as of the 2010 census. Its former name was Swastika Beach.

Demographics

References

Census-designated places in Jackson County, Minnesota
Census-designated places in Minnesota